The Flora Stakes (Japanese フローラステークス) is a Japanese Grade 2 flat horse race in Japan for three-year-old Thoroughbred fillies. It is run over a distance of 2000 metres at Tokyo Racecourse in April.

The Flora Stakes was first run in 1966 and was elevated to Grade 2 status in 1984. It serves as a trial race for the Yushun Himba.

Winners since 2000

Earlier winners

 1984 - Lake Victoria
 1985 - Yukino Rose
 1986 - Mejiro Ramonu
 1987 - Max Beauty
 1988 - Ara Hokuto
 1989 - Foundry Popo
 1990 - Kyoei Tap
 1991 - Yamanin Marine
 1992 - Kyowa Hoseki
 1993 - Yamahisa Laurel
 1994 - Golden Jack
 1995 - Silent Happiness
 1996 - Center Rising
 1997 - Orange Peel
 1998 - Max Can Do
 1999 - Stinger

See also
 Horse racing in Japan
 List of Japanese flat horse races

References

Turf races in Japan